Dave Donley (born August 29, 1954) is an American politician and attorney who was born in Anchorage, Alaska and served in the Alaska House of Representatives from District 11A from 1987 to 1993 and in the Alaska Senate from District J from 1993 to 2003.  He was elected to the Anchorage School Board in 2017 and re-elected in 2020.  
He graduated from Dimond High School in Anchorage in 1972, University of Oregon with a BS in Political Science in 1976 (Phi Beta Kappa), and University of Washington Law School with a Juris Doctor Degree in 1979.  He was admitted to the Alaska Bar Association in 1979.  He qualified for membership in Mensa  (IQ is in the top 2% of the population) and was admitted June, 1986.  He was Certified as an Arbitrator for Better Business Bureau in 2006.

From 2003 to 2008 he served as Chief of Adjudication and Hearing Officer for the State of Alaska. He was commissioned in the Alaska State Defense Force as a state military officer in 2008, rising to the rank of colonel in 2019. In 2019, he was appointed Deputy Commissioner of the Alaska State Department of Administration.

He joined Laborers Local 341 in 1974 and worked as a logger, firefighter, and construction worker on the Alaska Pipeline Project.  He served as Auditor, Training School Instructor, Election Judge, Organizer, Executive Board Member, and Recording Secretary before retiring from Local 341 in 2007.

He was an Alaska Delegate to the 2016 Republican National Convention where during the vote for the Presidential Nomination he objected to the refusal of the Convention Staff to count the Alaska votes as they were cast by the Alaska Delegation.

References

1954 births
Living people
Members of the Alaska House of Representatives
Alaska state senators
Alaska Democrats
Alaska Republicans